Harley Lewis (born May 5, 1974) is an American professional wrestler and shoot fighter who competes for independent promotions in the United States, Canada, Puerto Rico and Japan. He has had successful stints in the United States Wrestling Association, International World Class Championship Wrestling, the National Wrestling Alliance, Phoenix Championship Wrestling, Mid-Eastern Wrestling Federation, and the World Wide Wrestling Alliance. During the 1990s, he was a member of The Mistfits with Derek Domino and Lupus and held several tag team titles with them in various NWA-affiliated promotions and elsewhere on the independent circuit.

Lewis has also competed internationally wrestling in Big Japan Pro Wrestling and the World Wrestling Council holding the WWC Puerto Rico Heavyweight Championship in late 1999. He is also the longest reigning holder of the PCW Heavyweight Championship holding the title for 14-months before losing to The Wall in 2003.

Among his appearances include the NWA's 50th Anniversary Show in 1998 as well as a regular competitor at the Eddie Gilbert Memorial Brawl between 1996 and 1999.

Championships and accomplishments 
American Wrestling Council
AWC Tag Team Championship (1 time, inaugural) - with Derek Domino

IWA Hardcore
IWA Hardcore Tag Team Championship (1 time) - with Lupus

Mid-Eastern Wrestling Federation
MEWF Tag Team Championship (1 time) - with Derek Domino

National Wrestling Alliance
National
NWA United States Tag Team Championship (4 times) - with Derek Domino 
NWA World Six-Man Tag Team Championship (1 time, inaugural) - with Derek Domino and Lupus

NWA 2000
NWA 2000 Tag Team Championship (1 time) - with Lupus

New Jack City Wrestling
NJC Heavyweight Championship (1 time)
NJC Tag Team Championship (3 times) - with Psychotron

Phoenix Championship Wrestling
PCW Heavyweight Championship (1 time)

World Wrestling Alliance
 WWA Intercontinental Championship (2 times)

World Wrestling Council
WWC Puerto Rico Heavyweight Championship (1 time)

Pro Wrestling Illustrated
PWI ranked him # 348 of the 500 best singles wrestlers of the PWI 500 in 2000

References 

Living people
American male professional wrestlers
1974 births
20th-century professional wrestlers
21st-century professional wrestlers
WWC Puerto Rico Champions